An octant in solid geometry is one of the eight divisions of a Euclidean three-dimensional coordinate system defined by the signs of the coordinates.  It is similar to the two-dimensional quadrant and the one-dimensional ray.

The generalization of an octant is called orthant.

Naming and numbering

A convention for naming an octant is to give its list of signs, e.g. (+,−,−) or (−,+,−).   Octant (+,+,+) is sometimes referred to as the first octant, although similar ordinal name descriptors are not defined for the other seven octants.  The advantages of using the (±,±,±) notation are its unambiguousness, and extensibility for higher dimensions.

The following table shows the sign tuples together with likely ways to enumerate them.
A binary enumeration with − as 1 can be easily generalized across dimensions. A binary enumeration with + as 1 defines the same order as balanced ternary.
The Roman enumeration of the quadrants is in Gray code order, so the corresponding Gray code is also shown for the octants.

Verbal descriptions are ambiguous, because they depend on the representation of the coordinate system.
In the two depicted representations of a right-hand coordinate system, the first octant could be called right-back-top or right-top-front respectively.

See also

 Orthant
 Octant (plane geometry)
 Octree

References

Euclidean solid geometry